Udea exigualis is a moth in the family Crambidae. It was described by Alfred Ernest Wileman in 1911. It is found in Japan, China (Fujian, Guangxi, Guizhou, Hubei, Hunan, Sichuan, Tibet, Yunnan) and Pakistan.

The wingspan is 16–21 mm.

References

Moths described in 1911
exigualis